Veselin Popović (born 1 July 1975) is a Serbian former professional footballer who played as a striker.

Career
After starting out at his hometown club Vrbas, Popović was signed by Obilić in 1995. He spent the next three years with the Vitezovi and won the championship title in the 1997–98 season, before moving abroad to Germany. Over the following decade, Popović played for numerous clubs, most notably FSV Zwickau and 1. FC Schweinfurt 05.

Honours
Obilić
 First League of FR Yugoslavia: 1997–98
 FR Yugoslavia Cup: Runner-up 1997–98

References

External links
 
 
 

1. FC Schweinfurt 05 players
2. Bundesliga players
Association football forwards
Dynamo Dresden players
Expatriate footballers in Germany
FC Erzgebirge Aue players
FSV Zwickau players
First League of Serbia and Montenegro players
FK Obilić players
FK Vrbas players
People from Vrbas, Serbia
Regionalliga players
Serbia and Montenegro expatriate footballers
Serbia and Montenegro expatriate sportspeople in Germany
Serbia and Montenegro footballers
Serbian expatriate footballers
Serbian expatriate sportspeople in Germany
Serbian footballers
Sportfreunde Siegen players
SV Wacker Burghausen players
SV Wehen Wiesbaden players
1975 births
Living people